The 2022 Central Coast Pro Tennis Open was a professional tennis tournament played on outdoor hard courts. It was the fourth edition of the tournament which was part of the 2022 ITF Women's World Tennis Tour. It took place in Templeton, California, United States between 26 September and 2 October 2022.

Champions

Singles

  Madison Brengle def.  Robin Montgomery, 4–6, 6–4, 6–2

Doubles

  Nao Hibino /  Sabrina Santamaria def.  Sophie Chang /  Katarzyna Kawa, 6–4, 7–6(7–4)

Singles main draw entrants

Seeds

 1 Rankings are as of 19 September 2022.

Other entrants
The following players received wildcards into the singles main draw:
  Victoria Duval
  Alex Eala
  Maria Mateas
  Whitney Osuigwe

The following players received entry from the qualifying draw:
  Alexa Glatch
  Shavit Kimchi
  Robin Montgomery
  Himeno Sakatsume
  Katherine Sebov
  Janice Tjen
  Alexandra Vecic
  Kateryna Volodko

References

External links
 2022 Central Coast Pro Tennis Open at ITFtennis.com
 Official website

2022 ITF Women's World Tennis Tour
2022 in American tennis
September 2022 sports events in the United States
October 2022 sports events in the United States